Fanar 

Fanar (Matn), village situated in Lebanon
Fanar, Qatar Islamic Cultural Center, cultural organization in Doha, Qatar
Fener, neighborhood in Istanbul

See also
Fanari (disambiguation)
Fânari (disambiguation)